Isoetes beestonii is the oldest known species of the living quillwort genus from the latest Permian of New South Wales and Queensland. Originally considered earliest Triassic, it is now known to be latest Permian in age, immediately before the Permian Triassic mass extinction.

Description 
Isoetes beestonii is preserved as whole plants in life position within bedding planes, and presumably lived as an early successional weed in lake and pond sedimentary environments, like living Isoetes. Its leaves were wider and more succulent than modern species of Isoetes. Like modern Isoetes, fertile plants were little different from sterile plants, unlike Early Triassic Tomiostrobus which formed woody conelike fertile plants.

See also 
 Evolution of plants

References 

Permian plants
Prehistoric lycophytes
beestonii